Bashkirov is a Russian masculine surname, its feminine counterpart is Bashkirova. Notable people with the surname include: 

Andrei Bashkirov (born 1970), Russian ice hockey player
Dmitri Bashkirov (1931–2021), Russian pianist and educator
Elena Bashkirova (born 1958), Russian-born pianist and musical director, daughter of Dmitri
Ruslan Bashkirov (born 1989), Russian ice hockey player
Sergey Bashkirov (born 1971), Russian painter
Yevgeni Bashkirov (born 1991), Russian football player

Russian-language surnames
Ethnonymic surnames